Springer Lake is a lake in central North America, in the province of Manitoba, Canada, about  north east of the city of Winnipeg.  It is situated in Nopiming Provincial Park.

The Canadian Forces School of Survival and Aeromedical Training (CFSSAT) conducts Survival, Evasion, Resistance and Escape training at Springer Lake.  Of note, CFSSAT's activities have served to reduce poaching within the Provincial Park.

References
Government of Manitoba. Nopiming Map

Lakes of Manitoba